Francesco Rapisarda (born 4 June 1992) is an Italian footballer who plays as a defender for  club Catania.

Biography
Born in Catania, Sicily Island, Rapisarda started his career at Catania. He was transferred to fifth division (amateur) club Cosenza in 2011–12 Serie D season.

On 31 August 2012 he joined L'Aquila in the fourth division. Rapisarda played 30 times in 2012–13 Lega Pro Seconda Divisione. He made his club debut on 12 September, his only appearance in Lega Pro cup.

On 4 July 2013 Parma signed Rapisarda on free transfer, but on 9 July Rapisarda was transferred to Vigor Lamezia Calcio in co-ownership deal (€100,000). Parma also signed Antonio Maglia (undisclosed) and Giovanbattista Catalano from Lamezia (€110,000); Lamezia signed Matteo Bibba, Stefano Rossini and Diego De Giorgi in temporary deals from Parma.

In February 2014 Rapisarda was suspended 6 games for illegal contact with a staff of Martina in March 2013, the opponent of his team.

On 16 June 2014 Lamezia bought back Catalano for a peppercorn of €500 as well as Rapisarda for undisclosed fee. Rapisarda had a contract with Lamezia until 30 June 2016.

Lumezzane
Lumezzane signed Rapisarda on 29 July 2015.

Sambenedettese
Rapisarda joined Sambenedettese on 14 January 2017, with Giacomo Zappacosta moved to opposite direction.

Triestina
On 26 August 2020 he signed a 2-year contract with Triestina.

Catania
On 7 August 2022 he returned to his hometown by signing an annual contract with Catania.

References

External links
 AIC profile (data by www.football.it) 

1992 births
Living people
Footballers from Catania
Footballers from Sicily
Italian footballers
Association football defenders
Serie C players
Serie D players
Catania S.S.D. players
Cosenza Calcio players
L'Aquila Calcio 1927 players
Vigor Lamezia players
F.C. Lumezzane V.G.Z. A.S.D. players
A.S. Sambenedettese players
U.S. Triestina Calcio 1918 players